Latiaxis lischkeanus is a species of medium-sized sea snail, a marine gastropod mollusk in the subfamily Coralliophilinae of the family Muricidae.

References
 Powell A. W. B., New Zealand Mollusca, William Collins Publishers Ltd, Auckland, New Zealand 1979

External links
 Photo

Gastropods of Australia
Gastropods of New Zealand
Latiaxis
Gastropods described in 1882
Marine gastropods